Shaikh Muhammad Sharif Sabir (Urdu: شریف صابر‬;  18 May 1928 – 1 October 2015), better known as Sharif Sabir, was a Pakistani-Punjabi scholar, poet, researcher and educationist who is widely known for editing the most authentic version of Heer Waris Shah published in 1985. It took him over ten years to complete this work. Earlier, he had already written a book of poetry and edited Puran Bhagat of Qadir Yar, and translated parts of Gulistan and Bustan of Saadi Shirazi into Punjabi. He edited Sultan Bahu’s poetry collection Abiat-e-Bahu, Mian Mohammad Bakhsh's monumental work of Saiful Muluk, the poetry of Bulleh Shah and had just completed editing of the poetry of Baba Farid before his demise. Being also a scholar of Persian and Arabic, he undertook a Herculean translation of Ali Hajweri Gunj Bakhsh’s Kashf ul Mahjoob from Persian to Urdu. He was commissioned by the Punjab Auqaf Department.

Early life

Sharif Sabir was born into a poor household in Pakki Saraan (near Lahore), Sheikhupura District, Pakistan. Unlike his age fellows, he spent most of his teenage years working and earning to pay for his tuitions. He started his career as an English language teacher in a government school. While teaching English to elementary classes, he privately did a Masters in Persian and went on to teach Persian and Urdu at Lahore’s Central Model School. He was promoted to become a language specialist and taught at the Central Training College. He became a headmaster before the Punjab government and the Waris Shah Academy got his services on deputation to complete his research on Heer Waris Shah. Although he took his retirement in the 1980s, he continued his research and published a number of books in later years.

Life Long Research - Editing of Heer Waris Shah
Sharif Sabir was posted for two years at the Waris Shah Memorial Committee (WSMC), which was established by the cultural department of Punjab. Here, he was tasked to build Waris Shah’s Shrine in Jandiala Sher Khan and also publish an authentic Heer Waris Shah text. By the time his posting began, Sabir had already spent 12 years on his research. During his posting, apart from reviewing his previous work he was also able to access one 1821 hand-written manuscript that according to him was found in Patiala, Punjab. He traveled all over Punjab, especially to places where the old dialect was still spoken. He went to see the traders and the craftsmen to understand the terms used by Waris Shah while describing their trades and professions; he went to snake-charmers to learn about snakes; he visited scholars of folklore and consulted many a book on mythology to understand the background of the myths and the stories alluded to by Waris Shah.

WSMC published Sabir’s edited Heer in 1985. Sabir later in 2006, printed a revised and updated edition with the help of Progressive Books, Lahore. The most striking feature of his Heer compilation is that he has provided the meanings of difficult words and details about people and places that appear in Waris Shah’s epic.

Marriage and children
Sharif Sabir was married to Zubaidah Akhter and had four sons and two daughters. One of his sons died as a teenager in an accident while playing with fire. His remaining children emigrated to the United States in 2008. He visited them in 2013 and stayed for two years. In 2015, he decided to go back to his village in Pakistan.

Death and afterward
Sharif Sabir died in his village after he developed a chest infection. He was buried near a friendly saint’s tomb in Narang Mandi.

Published works
All the books Sharif Sabir edited include: Heer Waris Shah, complete poetry of Bulleh Shah and Sultan Bahu and Saiful Malook of Mian Muhammad Bakhsh -- have one outstanding feature in common. All of them carry a glossary of difficult words. No other book in Punjabi Literature, other than those written on the Guru Granth Sahib, contain comprehensive glossaries like the ones found in the works he has edited. Following is a list of books he has authored, edited or translated:

Honours, decorations, awards and distinctions
He was given the Pride of Performance and a paltry sum of Rs 70,000 for his monumental work Heer Waris Shah.

See also

Autobiography in Punjabi

References

1928 births
2015 deaths
Pakistani philosophers
Pakistani poets
Punjabi-language poets